Walter Myers may refer to:

Walter Dean Myers (1937–2014), African American author of young adult literature
Walter Kendall Myers (born 1937), spy for Cuba who worked for the United States State Department
Walter Myers (physician) (1872–1901), British physician, toxicologist and parasitologist
Walter Myers Jr. (1914–1967), Justice of the Indiana Supreme Court